Marisa Masullo (born 8 May 1959) is a former Italian athlete, who mainly competed in the 100 metres and 200 metres.

Biography
Masullo was born in Milan, Italy and competed for Italy at three Olympic Games, in Moscow 1980, Los Angeles 1984 and  Seoul 1988. She was a three-time gold medal winner in the 200 m at the Mediterranean Games She also won a silver medal in the 200 m at the 1981 Universiade and a bronze medal in the 60 metres at the 1983 European Indoor Championships.

Marisa Masullo held the national records for 60 metres, 100 and 200 metres.

National titles
Marisa Masullo won 30 individual national championship from 1978 to 1993 (all-time record-woman).

See also
 Italian Athletics Championships - Multi winners
 Italy national athletics team - Women's more caps
 Italian records in athletics
 Italy national relay team
 Italian all-time top lists - 100 metres
 Italian all-time top lists - 200 metres

References

External links
 

1959 births
Athletes from Milan
Italian female sprinters
Athletes (track and field) at the 1980 Summer Olympics
Athletes (track and field) at the 1984 Summer Olympics
Athletes (track and field) at the 1988 Summer Olympics
Olympic athletes of Italy
Living people
Mediterranean Games gold medalists for Italy
Mediterranean Games silver medalists for Italy
Mediterranean Games bronze medalists for Italy
Athletes (track and field) at the 1979 Mediterranean Games
Athletes (track and field) at the 1983 Mediterranean Games
Athletes (track and field) at the 1987 Mediterranean Games
Athletes (track and field) at the 1991 Mediterranean Games
Universiade medalists in athletics (track and field)
World Athletics Championships athletes for Italy
Mediterranean Games medalists in athletics
Universiade silver medalists for Italy
Universiade bronze medalists for Italy
Medalists at the 1981 Summer Universiade
Italian Athletics Championships winners
Olympic female sprinters